Kalateh-ye Sadat may refer to:
 Kalateh-ye Sadat, North Khorasan
 Kalateh-ye Sadat, Razavi Khorasan
 Kalateh-ye Sadat, Semnan

See also
 Kalateh-ye Sadat-e Bala (disambiguation)